Dulce River (or "Sweet River") is a river in Guatemala, completely contained within the department of Izabal. It is part of a lake and river system that has become a popular cruising sailboat destination.

The river begins at the point where it flows out of Lake Izabal. At the entrance to the river there is a small Spanish colonial fort, the Castillo de San Felipe de Lara, built to stop pirates entering the lake from the Caribbean when this part of Central America was an important shipping staging point.

Just after the river flows from Lake Izabal it is spanned by one of the biggest bridges in Central America. On one side of the bridge is the town of Fronteras, commonly referred to by the name Río Dulce, the local center of commerce for the area.  Fronteras has a local vegetable market, attracting locals from the countryside who arrive in dugout canoes. Most of these boats are powered with Japanese outboard motors but many come to market day paddling these cayucos by hand. On the other side is the town of El Relleno. Nearby is the children's village of Casa Guatemala, an orphanage that houses roughly 250 children and provides them with education and nourishment.

From Fronteras the river flows east for a few kilometres. In this stretch there are several marinas and resorts. The river then flows into a long narrow lake called El Golfete. This lake has an island and a large natural anchorage. A few houses and a couple of small businesses line the shore.

Wild flowers bloom throughout the foliage and howler monkeys and toucans can be seen. Waterfalls flow over the lip of the gorge after rainfall.

The river enters the Caribbean Sea near the Garifuna town of Livingston.

Río Dulce National Park

The Río Dulce National Park is in the department of Izabal in Guatemala.
The park covers an area of   along the banks of the Dulce river and the El Golfete.

Historical images

The New Adventures of Tarzan (1935)

The film The New Adventures of Tarzan was filmed entirely on location in Guatemala in 1935. They reached some locations using the railroad service in Guatemala, which controlled by the American International Railways of Central America (IRCA), owned by the United Fruit Company— and had major stations at Puerto San José, Guatemala City and Puerto Barrios.

The railroad company offered tours to visit the UFCO banana plantations in Izabal and the Maya city of Quiriguá —which at the time was placed within UFCO property— and offered their visitors the option to comfortably sail Río Dulce and Lake Izabal to Livingston in one of their steam boats. Here are a few photographs taken from an excursion made in 1927 by the Guatemalan History and Geography Society:

Izabal excursion in 1927

See also
 
 
El Estor
 List of places in Guatemala

Notes and references

References

Bibliography

External links 
 Rio Dulce National Park Official site
 
 

Rivers of Guatemala
National parks of Guatemala
Geography of the Izabal Department
Protected areas established in 1955
1955 establishments in Guatemala